The St. Helena Darter (Sympetrum dilatatum) was a species of dragonfly in the family Libellulidae. It was endemic to Saint Helena. In 2021, it was declared extinct by the IUCN. There have been no recorded sightings since 1962 and it is no longer present at the only two locations it was previously found at.

References

Libellulidae
Taxonomy articles created by Polbot
Insects described in 1892